The Basus (or Basous) War (often written al-Basus War;  ḥarb al-basūs) was a 40-year conflict between two cousin tribes in Arabia of Late Antiquity which was started by the killing of a camel owned by woman named Al Basus under the proteciton of her brother in law Mura 

The Taghlib and Bakr tribes fought for roughly forty years (from 494-534 CE), locked in a perpetual cycle of vengeance. In parts of the Arab world today, the Basus War has been incorporated into an aphorism warning people against vendettas.

The story

The story happened long before the Islamic era in Arabia, the start of the 40-year war was when a woman called Al-Basous, went to visit her niece, Jalila bint Murrah, along with her nephew, Jassas ibn Murrah, all of them belonged to the tribe of Bakr.

Jalila was married to Kulayb, the leader of the Taghleb tribe, who was known to be extremely protective of his property and land. He saw Al-Basous' foreign camel in his territory, and shot it with an arrow. Al-Basous in turn got furious and exaggeratingly complained to her nephew that she was humiliated and insulted by this act. Jassas, enraged by his aunt’s words went to the leader of Taghleb, his brother in-law in the wild, and shot him with a spear from the back, a sign of cowardice and betrayal to Antiquity Arabs. Jasas was scared of his deed, and ran off, Amr or Omar (Jasas' friend) stayed there. Kulaib asked for water, but Amr shook his head in awe and chased after his friend. Kulaib stayed in the wild screaming for help, dying. After walking in the wilderness, he finds a shepherd, who gives him water, Kulaib asks him to check if the wound is fatal, the shepherd refuses, kulaib forces him to, so the shepherd does, and sure enough, its fatal. Kulaib gets mad and declares his revenge from Bakr and Jasas, then it is said that he either tells the shepherd a poem telling his brother Abu Layla al-Muhalhel to take revenge or he uses this blood to write in Arabic on a cliff wall his will to al-Muhalhel. 
This triggered the war between the two tribes. Later on in the war, one of Bakr’s allies, a tribe leader called Al-Harith ibn Abbad, thought that he would not drag himself and his people into this silly war, over and above, he took an initiative to stop the blood-shed by sending his son, Ojayr, to now leader of Taghleb and brother of the late Kulayb, al-Muhalhel, for truce. It was a tradition at that time to send someone of great significance to sacrifice himself for the killing of someone, and it was expected that he would then be forgiven to start peace. But unexpectedly, and away from traditions and ethics, al-Muhalhel kills Ojayr! The mourning father said a poem of 40 verses, stating that he is now part of it (the war). He ordered his men to shave their heads, and he cut his horse’s mane and tail hair, which became a tradition since then among the Arabs as a sign of grief until revenge. The war almost ended the last few of Taghleb, and Al-Harith said his famous word, I will not talk to Taghleb until earth talks to me, i.e never!

When Taghleb thought it was the end, they dug a trench along the road where Al-Harith ibn Abbad passes by, a man from Taghleb hid there and sang a poem asking for forgiveness, and fulfilling the condition of the earth talking to Al-Harith. At the time he had avenged his son’s death, and didn’t have to go back on his word ("I will not talk to Taghleb until earth talks to me"). The 40 years war had ended.

See also
Al-Zeir Salim

References

5th-century conflicts
6th-century conflicts
Arab history
5th century
6th century in Asia
Banu Taghlib
Banu Bakr
Pre-Islamic Arabia